Estadio Santa Lucía is a soccer stadium located in Malacatán, Guatemala. It is home to Liga Nacional club Malacateco. Its capacity is 7,000 people.

Santa Lucia